(Traditional Chinese, Japanese, and Korean Hanja), or  (Simplified Chinese) may refer to:

China
Hedong (disambiguation)

Japan
Katō District, Hokkaidō, in Tokachi Subprefecture

South Korea
Hadong, county of South Gyeongsang Province